Minski Fabris (born 2 August 1941) is a Croatian former sailor. He competed at the 1972 Summer Olympics, the 1976 Summer Olympics and the 1980 Summer Olympics.

References

External links
 

1941 births
Living people
Croatian male sailors (sport)
Olympic sailors of Yugoslavia
Sailors at the 1972 Summer Olympics – Finn
Sailors at the 1976 Summer Olympics – Finn
Sailors at the 1980 Summer Olympics – Finn
Competitors at the 1971 Mediterranean Games
Competitors at the 1979 Mediterranean Games
Sportspeople from Split, Croatia
Mediterranean Games gold medalists for Yugoslavia
Mediterranean Games bronze medalists for Yugoslavia
Mediterranean Games medalists in sailing